The 1959 Purdue Boilermakers football team was an American football team that represented Purdue University during the 1959 Big Ten Conference football season. In their fourth season under head coach Jack Mollenkopf, the Boilermakers compiled a 5–2–2 record, finished in a tie for third place in the Big Ten Conference with a 4–2–1 record against conference opponents, and outscored opponents by a total of 109 to 81.

Schedule

References

Purdue
Purdue Boilermakers football seasons
Purdue Boilermakers football